In Greek mythology, Epione (Ancient Greek: Ἠπιόνη) is the wife of Asclepius.  Her name derives from the word ηπιος ("soothing"), and she was probably a personification of the care needed for recovery.  With Asclepius, she had five daughters, Aceso, Aglaea, Hygieia, Iaso, and Panacaea as listed in the Suda. She also had two sons, Machaon and Podalirius, who are mentioned in the Iliad of Homer as well as Telesphoros.

Epigraphical evidence suggests that Epione was a cultic figure in Athens, Epidauros, Kos, and Pergamon.

See also
 List of Greek mythological figures

Note

References 

 Suida, Suda Encyclopedia translated by Ross Scaife, David Whitehead, William Hutton, Catharine Roth, Jennifer Benedict, Gregory Hays, Malcolm Heath Sean M. Redmond, Nicholas Fincher, Patrick Rourke, Elizabeth Vandiver, Raphael Finkel, Frederick Williams, Carl Widstrand, Robert Dyer, Joseph L. Rife, Oliver Phillips and many others. Online version at the Topos Text Project.

Health goddesses
Asclepius in mythology
Greek goddesses